Mirza Tahir Hussain (born 1 June 1970) is a British man paroled on 17 November 2006 after spending 18 years on death row in Pakistan for the murder of a taxicab driver named Jamshed Khan in 1988, a crime which he says he committed in self-defence, as Khan pulled out a gun and tried to sexually assault him. In the ensuing struggle, the gun went off, fatally injuring Khan. Mirza was held in the Adiala jail in Rawalpindi. His representative is Greg Mulholland, MP for Leeds North West.

Conviction
His conviction was quashed by the Pakistani Supreme Court, but he was then found guilty by The Federal Sharia Court. He was due to be hanged on 1 June 2006. The execution was delayed multiple times from the initial June 2006 date. The first delay, from June to August, may have resulted from an effort to avoid an execution during a visit to Pakistan by Prince Charles. A second delay moved the scheduled date back to 1 September 2006. This would reportedly give Mr. Hussain's family time to negotiate blood money with the relatives of the victim, a practice under Islamic law. The next delay, to 1 October 2006 at 0500 BST, may have been related to the observation of the holy month of Ramadan.

Mirza's brother, Amjad Hussain, was outspoken in his defense, referring to the execution delays as "psychological torture... it's die another day." "There are serious doubts about the safety of Mirza Tahir Hussain's conviction and he still faces execution in a matter of weeks," said Tim Hancock of Amnesty International. Catherine Wolthuizen of Fair Trials Abroad commented that the death sentence was based on "fabricated evidence and double jeopardy" and that execution "would be an appalling travesty of justice." The victim's mother, Zarvari Bibi, characterized the death sentence as the will of God and had threatened to set herself on fire if he did not hang.

In spite of a clemency plea from Prince Charles, Mirza was given only a two-month stay of execution with a new execution date set for 31 December 2006. The President of Pakistan, Pervez Musharraf, initially hesitated to take any action, claiming that he was not a dictator and that he could not violate a court judgement. However, Musharraf ultimately intervened, resulting in commutation of the sentence to life imprisonment. Under Pakistani law, those given life sentences are eligible for parole after 25 years. Since Mirza had served 18 years, and maintained good behavior, he was paroled early on November 17. He has since returned to the United Kingdom.

See also
 Capital punishment in Pakistan
 Human Rights Commission of Pakistan
 Human rights in Pakistan
 Sharia

Notes

References
 "Death row man's execution delayed". BBC News. 19 October 2006 
 "Death row man's 'nightmare ends'". BBC News. 16 November 2006 
 "Fateful trip sealed man's future". BBC News. 16 November 2006 
 "Death row man 'being counselled'". BBC News. 18 November 2006 
 "'No reprieve' for death row man ". BBC News. 1 October 2006 
 "Death row case 'to be reviewed' ". BBC News. 12 September 2006 
 "Death row man pleads for his life ". BBC News. 7 September 2006 
 "Execution delay for death row man". BBC News. 16 August 2006  
 "'No mercy' for death row Briton ". BBC News. 1 August 2006 
 "Execution delay for death row man ". BBC News. 27 July 2006 
 "New execution date set for Briton ". BBC News. 21 July 2006 
 "Brother talks of death row ordeal ". BBC News. 26 May 2006

External links
 Amnesty UK - Death Penalty - urgent appeal against execution of Mirza Hussain
 Amnesty UK - Commute death sentence of Mirza Tahir Hussain
 The Muslim Parliament of Great Britain - Muslim Parliament expresses concern over Briton on death row in Pakistan 10/05/06
 Islamic Human Rights Commission - British Muslim Facing Execution in Pakistan - 11/05/06
 The Times Online - Fight to save death row Briton who was acquitted of murder - 19/05/06
 Under Progress - The damning silence over Mirza Tahir Hussain - 3/10/06
 Indymedia Ireland - Pakistan: Death Penalty, Unfair Trial, Right to Life - 12/10/06
 BBC News - Blair pledge over execution case - 18/10/06
 Channel 4 News - Briton's execution timed for Prince Charles tour - 18/10/06
 The Independent - Pakistan names date for execution as pressure grows over prince's visit - 20/10/06
 BBC News - Death row man 'glad to be home' - 18/11/06
 BBC News - Adjusting will be hard for death row man - 18/11/06
 BBC News - Death row man speaks of freedom - 27/11/06
 The Times - Freed after 17 years and home to a hug from the brother who never gave up - 28/11/06

1970 births
Living people
Prisoners sentenced to death by Pakistan
People convicted of murder by Pakistan
People from Leeds
British people convicted of murder
British people imprisoned abroad
English people of Pakistani descent
Overturned convictions in Pakistan